There have been two baronetcies created for persons with the surname Armstrong, both in the Baronetage of the United Kingdom. One creation is extant as of 2010.

The Armstrong Baronetcy, of Gallen Priory in the King's County, was created on 18 September 1841 for Andrew Armstrong, Receiver-General of Stamps in Ireland and Member of Parliament for King's County. The third Baronet was High Sheriff of King's County in 1914. The Armstrong family was originally from the Scottish Borders. Andrew Armstrong, ancestor and namesake of the first Baronet, settled in County Fermanagh in the early 17th century.

The Armstrong Baronetcy, of Ashburn Place in the County of London, was created on 19 October 1892 for George Armstrong, owner of The Globe newspaper. The title became extinct on the death of the third Baronet in 1944.

Armstrong baronets, of Gallen Priory (1841)
Sir Andrew Armstrong, 1st Baronet (1786–1863)
Sir Edmund Frederick Armstrong, 2nd Baronet (1836–1899)
Sir Andrew Harvey Armstrong, 3rd Baronet (1866–1922)
Sir Nesbitt William Armstrong, 4th Baronet (1875–1953)
Sir Andrew St Clare Armstrong, 5th Baronet (1912–1987)
Sir Andrew Clarence Francis Armstrong, CMG, 6th Baronet (1907–1997)
Sir Christopher John Edmund Stuart Armstrong, 7th Baronet (born 1940)

The heir apparent is the present holder's son Charles Andrew Armstrong (born 1973).

Armstrong baronets, of Ashburn Place (1892)
Sir George Carlyon Hughes Armstrong, 1st Baronet (1836–1907)
Sir George Elliot Armstrong, 2nd Baronet (1866–1940), one of the 8 founding members of The Castaways' Club in 1895
Sir Francis Philip Armstrong, 3rd Baronet (1871–1944)

References

Kidd, Charles, Williamson, David (editors). Debrett's Peerage and Baronetage (1990 edition). New York: St Martin's Press, 1990.

Baronetcies in the Baronetage of the United Kingdom
Extinct baronetcies in the Baronetage of the United Kingdom